Acalyptris punctulata is a moth of the family Nepticulidae. It is found in California.

The larvae feed on Ceanothus cuneatus and Rhamnus californica. They mine the leaves of their host plant. The mine is a serpentine track, often bent back on itself and indistinct in its early stages on the thick-leaved Ceanothus. It is pale green with broad black line of frass on the Rhamnus leaves. The cocoon is reddish brown or grayish.

References

External links

Nepticulidae
Endemic fauna of California
Moths of North America
Fauna of the California chaparral and woodlands
Fauna of the Sierra Nevada (United States)
Moths described in 1910
Fauna without expected TNC conservation status